The United States Bankruptcy Court for the District of Utah is the United States bankruptcy court in Utah; it is associated with the United States District Court for the District of Utah. The court main office is based in Salt Lake City with other courtrooms available (as needed) in Ogden and St. George.

External links 
 Official website

Utah
Utah law
Courts and tribunals with year of establishment missing